Ganton is a village and civil parish in North Yorkshire, England, UK.

Ganton may also refer to:

Places
 Ganton Street, London, England, UK; a street

Fictional locations
 Ganton, a fictional town in Grand Theft Auto: San Andreas

People

Surname
 Douglas Ganton, sound engineer

Given name
 Ganton Scott (1903-1977) hockey player

Facilities and structures
 Ganton Golf Club, Ganton, North Yorkshire, England, UK
 Ganton railway station, Ganton, North Yorkshire, England, UK

Other uses
 Ganton Stakes, a UK horserace

See also

 
 Saint-Ganton, Brittany, France; a commune
 Gan (disambiguation)

Disambiguation pages with given-name-holder lists
Disambiguation pages with surname-holder lists